Raavoyi Chandamama is a 1999 Indian Telugu-language romance film directed by Jayanth C. Paranjee. It stars Nagarjuna, Jagapathi Babu, Anjala Zhaveri, Keerthi Reddy, and the music was composed by Mani Sharma. The film was produced by C. Aswani Dutt under the Vyjayanthi Movies banner. The film's title is based on a song from Missamma (1955). Raavoyi Chandamama was not commercially successful.

The film is loosely based on the 1957 American film An Affair to Remember which in turn was a remake of 1939 movie Love Affair. The American film was also remade in Hindi as Mann which released in the same year. Raavoyi Chandamama was dubbed and released in Hindi as Sanam Tere Hain Hum and in Tamil as Shankar.

Plot
The film begins in U. S. where Sasi, a famous Indian pop singer is on the move conducting his music concerts. Meghana a US-educated girl stays with his uncle V.K. Sonty’s family. The two already have fiancés Sujit & Rukmini respectively and are enthusiastically looking forward to their arrival at India. Once, Sasi & Meghana acquainted in a rave when she misconstrues him as a tomcat. 

After a series of donnybrook, they cruise in Leo Star from Singapore to Vizag. Accordingly, the tail forwards funnily. Over time, Meghana be aware of Sasi’s goodness and she befriends him. In between, Sasi halts at Andaman accompanying Meghana to meet his grandmother and spend a wonderful time with her. After reboarding the cruise, the pair is unable to stop the inevitable thing that feels like it may be love and proposes. At that point, Sasi explains to Meghana that they are in vacillating and that the fondness is might generated out of infatuation too. Hence, he launches a bid that they should hold on for 90 days without contact. At the closing time, if they sense the same, as today, they will meet at the lighthouse of Vizag port. 

Now the cruise reaches the coast where Sasi & Rukmini gives them warm welcome. The twosome attempts to hang out with their fiancés but fails. Consequently, days fly, and the turtle doves experience the same endearment. Just before a day, Sasi is cognizant that his grandmother is ailed. So, he proceeds to Andaman writing an apology letter to Rukmini affirming his love story and her insight into the situation. On the 90th day, Meghana is waiting for Sasi at the lighthouse. Since the time is running out Sasi rushes from Andaman taking the blessings of his grandmother. But unfortunately, he meets with an accident and fails to land. Thus, Meghana with woe accepts knit Sujit misinterpreting Sasi not to love her. Soon after recovery, Sasi calls Meghana, hears about her nuptial and he also wrongs. On the day of the wedding, Sasi attends with Rukmini through whom Meghana learns the actuality. Forthwith, Sasi sings a song as a word of honor given to Meghana when they suppress themselves. At last, Sujit discerns it, makes everyone realize the eminence of love, and unites them. Finally, the movie ends on a happy note with the marriage of Sasi & Meghana.

Cast

 Nagarjuna Akkineni as Sasi Kumar
 Jagapati Babu as Sujeeth
 Anjala Zhaveri as Meghana
 Keerthi Reddy as Rukmini
 Tanikella Bharani
 Chandra Mohan as Meghana's father
 Giri Babu as Sujit's father
 Ali as Sasi's friend
 Vivekvasu as Sasi's friend 
 Venu Madhav as KVR
 M. S. Narayana as Servant
 AVS as V. K. Sonty
 Mallikarjuna Rao as Mallaiah
 Ranganath as Meghana's uncle
 Raghunatha Reddy as Sundaram Murthy, Rukmini's father
 Maharshi Raghava as Meghana's brother
 Shavukar Janaki as Sasi's grandmother
 Kaushal Manda as Nikhil's friend
 Jhansi as Gowri
 Siva Parvathi as Meghana's aunt
 Sudha as Meghana's mother
 Rajitha as Meghana's aunt
 Indu Anand as Sujit's mother
 Baby Niharika as Dolly
 Aishwarya Rai as item number "Love To Live"

Soundtrack

The music was composed by Mani Sharma. Music is released on Supreme Music Company.
Hindi (Dubbed Version) — Sanam Tere Hain Hum

References

External links
 

1999 films
1999 romantic drama films
Indian romantic drama films
Films scored by Mani Sharma
Films shot in the United States
1990s Telugu-language films
Films directed by Jayanth C. Paranjee